Çöp Şiş (pronounced 'chop shish') is a type of lamb shish kebab eaten throughout Anatolia in Turkey. 

The etymology of the name is uncertain, though 'Çöp' means garbage or rubbish in modern Turkish, and may have come from the word meaning 'chaff', the stalk of wheat removed during winnowing. It has also been suggested that they are so called because the meat used is the smaller scraps of meat that are not used for other types of kebab.

Çöp şiş is generally cooked on wooden skewers rather than iron ones. During preparation, the lamb meat and pieces of fat are mixed with garlic and tomato and left to marinate with black pepper, oregano and olive oil, before cooking over an ocak, or grill.

It is usually served with grilled peppers and onion, with bread as an option to wrap the lamb and vegetables inside.

See also
 List of kebabs

References

Turkish cuisine
Middle Eastern grilled meats
Lamb dishes
Mediterranean cuisine
Middle Eastern cuisine
Skewered kebabs
Turkish words and phrases